Sava Bjelanović (15 October 1850 – 1897) was a Dalmatian journalist and politician, the leader of the Serb People's Party in Dalmatia and one of the most prominent Dalmatian Serbs of the 19th century. As a writer, he represented a classical reaction against decadent romanticism in literature and an anticlerical rationalism in general thought. As a politician he represented Serbs of both Eastern Orthodox and Roman Catholic denominations in the Diet of Dalmatia.

Biography

Sava Bjelanović was born at Đevrske near Knin in Dalmatia.
Bjelanović completed his elementary and high school education in Italian in Zadar, the then capital of Dalmatia. He became a member of the United Serbian Youth. He studied law at the University of Vienna, and returned home in 1880 to open his practice in Zadar. Although trained in law, Bjelanović decided to make a career in literary journalism and politics. He spent the next seventeen years battling injustices and championing human rights among his people.

In 1880 Bjelanović established the newspaper Srpski list (Serbian News). Later he formed the Srpski glas newspaper (Serbian Voice) which was seen as a continuation of Srpski list which was suppressed in 1888. Both newspapers were very popular and influential. While principal theoreticians of Orthodox clericism tried to identify Serbs with Orthodoxy, Bjelanović, leader of the Serbian National Party of the Littoral, propagated interreligious equality, launching among the popular masses in Dalmatia the slogan "Love your brother irrespective of his religion". His editorials were widely read for his fearless attacks on the unwisdom of Austrian policy and the injustices done by the Austrian authorities to all Dalmatian citizens. Glas continued eight years after Bjelanović's death, before it became a victim of political power play.

In 1883 Bjelanović was elected in the Dalmatian parliament. The greatest success of his political party was the 1890 election in Dubrovnik, where his party won a decisive victory.

He also wrote a book which exposed the excesses of the Habsburg monarchy in the later half of the nineteenth century. In his editorials and speeches he gave a tremendous impetus to learning by his dedicated search for truth and by his exposition of a critical method.

He was one of the co-founders of the Dalmatian Lazarica Serbian Orthodox Church and headed regularly its Vidovdan (Saint Vitus's Day) councils. He died in the city where he spent most of his life—Zadar—in 1897. He was buried in his birth village of Đevrske near Knin.

Bjelanović was a contemporary of well-known Dalmatian politicians, members of the Serb-Italian Autonomist Party coalition, and writers such as Đorđe Vojnović, Konstantin Vojnović, Dušan Baljak, Luigi Lapenna, Antonio Bajamonti, Roberto Ghiglianovich, Francesco Ghetaldi-Gondola, Niccolò Trigari, Luigi Ziliotto, and Marko Car, his biographer.

Literary work 

He is best known for Kroz Slavenske Zemlje (Through the Slavic Lands), published in Zadar in 1897. In that book he writes about the time he rode in a railway carriage full of Hungarians, wondering why his fellow traveller, who has just been proclaiming Russia the enemy of civilization, is so unwilling to admit he is ethnically a German. His other work: O hrvatskom državnom pravu: govor zastupnika Sava Bjelanovića u Dalmatinskom saboru godine 1892

References

Sources
Jovan Skerlić's Istorija nove srpske književnosti / History of Modern Serbian Literature (Belgrade, 1921) p. 437

External links 
 

1850 births
1897 deaths
People from Kistanje
People from the Kingdom of Dalmatia
Serbs of Croatia
Members of the Serbian Orthodox Church
Serb People's Party (Dalmatia) politicians
Austro-Hungarian journalists
Serbian newspaper people
Serbian writers
Serbian politicians
University of Vienna alumni